This is the complete list of Asian Winter Games medalists in speed skating from 1986 to 2017.

Men

100 m

500 m

1000 m

1500 m

5000 m

10000 m

Mass start

Team pursuit

Women

100 m

500 m

1000 m

1500 m

3000 m

5000 m

Mass start

Team pursuit

References

External links
 1990 Results
 1996 Results
 1999 Results
 2003 Results

Speed skating
Medalists

Speed skating-related lists